Powers Building is a historic office building located in Rochester in Monroe County, New York. It was built in 1869 and is a nine-story,  building, laid out around a large open stairwell in the center.  It features a triple mansard roof and observation tower which were added after initial construction, between 1873 and 1888, by Daniel Powers to maintain its standing as the tallest building in Rochester.  It was designed by noted Rochester architect Andrew Jackson Warner.

It was listed on the National Register of Historic Places in 1973. In 2019, the adjacent Powers Hotel was also added to the listing.

See also
National Register of Historic Places listings in Rochester, New York

References

External links

The Powers Building website

Office buildings in Rochester, New York
Office buildings on the National Register of Historic Places in New York (state)
Historic American Buildings Survey in New York (state)
Office buildings completed in 1869
National Register of Historic Places in Rochester, New York